Ross Millen (born 28 September 1994) is a Scottish professional footballer who plays as a right-back for Raith Rovers. Millen has previously played for Dunfermline Athletic, Livingston, Clyde, Queen's Park, Kilmarnock and Scunthorpe United.

He is the son of former Ayr United, Kilmarnock, Alloa, Hamilton and St Mirren defender Andy Millen.

Career
Millen made his Dunfermline debut against Hamilton on 2 February 2013, having played for the Dunfermline U20s team alongside team-mate Shaun Byrne. After the Pars went into administration, Millen featured regularly in the first-team, and scored his first goal for the club, a penalty, against Forfar in the First Division play-offs on 11 May 2013. Millen scored the winner in a 1–0 victory over rivals Raith in a Scottish League Cup match on Tuesday 5 August 2014. His other three goals all came from the penalty spot against Brechin, Forfar & Greenock.

After leaving Dunfermline at the end of the 2014–15 season, Millen signed for Scottish Championship side Livingston in July 2015. Millen stayed with the side for only six months, leaving in January 2016 in order to seek regular first-team football. Shortly after leaving Livingston, Millen signed a six-month contract with Clyde who he previously played for as a youth player. At the end of his contract, Millen was released by the Cumbernauld side. At the beginning of July 2016, Millen was signed by Scottish League Two side Queen's Park, with whom his father Andy Millen finished his playing career with.

Millen signed a six-month deal with Kilmarnock in July 2018. He stayed at the club for just under 3 years before letting his contract expire in June 2021.

On 6 July 2021, Millen joined League Two side Scunthorpe United, signing a two-year deal following his release from Kilmarnock.

Career statistics

References

External links

1994 births
Living people
Footballers from Glasgow
Dunfermline Athletic F.C. players
Livingston F.C. players
Clyde F.C. players
Queen's Park F.C. players
Kilmarnock F.C. players
Scunthorpe United F.C. players
Scottish Football League players
Scottish Professional Football League players
Association football defenders
Scottish footballers
Raith Rovers F.C. players